The Big Ten Conference's women's lacrosse tournament began in 2015, with the winner of the tournament receiving the conference's automatic bid into the NCAA Women's Lacrosse Championship.

The first two years of the tournament (2015–2016) all six teams participated in the event. The Big Ten's addition of Johns Hopkins for the 2016–2017 academic year brought the total number of teams in the conference to seven. However, starting with the 2017 event, the conference invited the top four teams from the regular season to the conference tournament matching the same format as the men.

Tournament champions

Tournament history by school

References